M. S. Verma was an Indian career banker who served as the seventeenth Chairman of State Bank of India.

Life and Education 
He holds a master's degree in Art and is a certified associate of the Indian Institute of Banking and Finance.

Banking career 
He joined the State Bank of India as a probationary officer in 1960 and served in a number of roles until finally becoming the seventeenth Chairman of the State Bank of India from 1 April 1997 until 30 September 1998.

After his retirement in 1998, he was succeeded as Chairman of the State Bank of India by M. P. Radhakrishnan.

Later career 
After having retired in 1998, he was appointed as the chairman of the Telecom Regulatory Authority of India on 23 March 2000.

He has also served as an honorary advisor to the Reserve Bank of India.

He has served as the international chairman of SREI Infrastructure Finance Limited.

References

External links 
 Official Biography
 SBI chairmen
 SBI history

Indian bankers
State Bank of India
Chairmen of the State Bank of India
Indian corporate directors
Living people
Year of birth missing (living people)